esSENSE Club is a club promoting atheism and science based in Kerala, India. Founded in 2016, the club emphasises propagating freethinking and rationalism among the Malayali community all over the world.

esSENSE Club Office bearers
 Aravind K, President
 Rajesh G S, Vice President
 Mohammed Ashraf, Secretary
 Manoj Raveendran, Joint Secretary
 Prashanth Randadath, Treasurer
 Geordie George, Executive Member
 Shahana, Executive Member

esSENSE Club Past Events
 esSENSE Times of India Debate – 4 April 2017
 Judiciary silently implementing Uniform Civil Code: Sebastian Paul; moderator Ravichandran C– 6 April 2017 
 Religiosity on the rise: Ravichandran C
 H.Farook Fund Handed Over – 19 April 2017
 Monetary help to the family of Murdered Atheist H Farook, Coimbatore
 esSENSE Masterminds’17 
 essentia 17 Annual Meet at Ernakulam Townhall
 esSENSE UK Formation 
 esSENSE Perth Australia

See also
 Kerala Yukthivadi Sangham
 Maharashtra Rationalist Association
 Sanal Edamaruku

References

External links
  

Rationalist groups based in India